Shashan is a village in Baghlan Province in north eastern Afghanistan.

See also 
Baghlan Province

References

External links 
Satellite map at Maplandia.com 

Populated places in Baghlan Province